Hwang Seong-beom (born 5 August 1975) is a South Korean boxer. He competed in the men's light welterweight event at the 2000 Summer Olympics.

References

1975 births
Living people
South Korean male boxers
Olympic boxers of South Korea
Boxers at the 2000 Summer Olympics
Place of birth missing (living people)
Light-welterweight boxers